The London Mens League, is a division in rugby league's tier 5. It was the highest level of amateur rugby league in the South of England until the creation in 2013 of Southern Conference League. It was first contested in 2005 as the South Premier division of the Rugby League Conference but is currently a standalone league run by London Rugby League.

Many of the clubs run juniors in the London Junior League.

History

The Rugby League Conference was born in 1997 as the Southern Conference.

The Premier Division was set up in 2005 for teams who had achieved a certain playing standard and were able to travel further afield to find stronger opposition. The new Premier Divisions included the North Premier, the South Premier, the Central Premier and the Welsh Premier.

Prior to the 2005 season National League Three side South London Storm announced that they were joining the South Premier; the other founder members came from the Conference regional divisions.

After the 2006 season with other teams withdrawing from National League Three, St Albans Centurions also decided to join the Premier South.

In 2012 it became a standalone league and St Albans Centurions returned to playing nationally in National Conference League division three

Community game pyramid

 National Conference League
 Southern Conference League
 London Mens League
 London Merit League

2014 Structure

NB: Staines Titans entered but failed to complete the season

Teams play each other on a home-and-away basis. Each Premier division then has its own play-off series to determine the champion with the five divisional winners entering the national play-offs.
The winner of the national play-offs is awarded the Harry Jepson Trophy.

NB: West London Sharks & South London Storm merged to form South West London Chargers

Past League Standings

1 competed as Ipswich Rhinos between 2005 and 2009
2 competed as Kingston Warriors between 2005 and 2007 and Elmbridge in 2008.
3 competed as Haringey Hornets in 2006
4 a merger of South London Storm and West London Sharks
5 midseason replacements for Hainault Bulldogs

Key

Grand Finals

Titles

 Hammersmith Hill Hoists: 4
 South London Storm: 2
 St Albans Centurions: 2
 West London Sharks: 2
 South West London Chargers: 3
 Medway Dragons: 1
 Brixton Bulls: 1

London Cup
2013: South West London Chargers

National play-offs

See also

 British rugby league system

References

External links

Rugby League Conference
Rugby league in London
Sports leagues established in 2012
2012 establishments in England